Roy Rognan (d 22 February 1943) was an American dancer and acrobat. He was killed in 1943 in the same plane crash in Lisbon that killed Tamara Drasin and injured Jane Froman.

He was best known for his dance act with "Miss Lorraine".

References

External links
Roy Rognan at IBDB

1943 deaths
American dancers
American civilians killed in World War II